Arctosa cinerea is one of the most conspicuous wolf spider of central Europe, with a palearctic distribution and also found in Congo.  The spider reaches a length of 17 mm (males only 14 mm), and occurs only on sandy beaches of rivers, lakes and oceans. Its grey-brown color makes for a good camouflage, and so it is not often seen, even if it wanders around during daylight. They dig holes in the ground, which they cover with silk, or hide under rocks.

Name
The species name cinereus is derived from Latin cinis ash, meaning "ashen".

References

cinerea
Spiders of Europe
Palearctic spiders
Spiders of Africa
Spiders described in 1777